Leucocoprinus subglobisporus is a species of mushroom-producing fungus in the family Agaricaceae.

Taxonomy 
It was first described in 1985 by the Japanese mycologist Tsuguo Hongo who classified it as Leucocoprinus subglobisporus.

Description 
Leucocoprinus subglobisporus is a small delicate mushroom with a very thin and fragile white flesh. 

Cap: 1.8-2.5cm wide, ovoid or campanulate (bell shaped) and then flattening or depressing with age with a slight raised umbo in the centre. The surface is white and covered in tiny pale greyish-red floccose (woolly) scales which are a darker brownish-red towards and at the centre of the cap. The cap edges are scaly with striations and furrows. Gills: Free, subdistant and white. Stem: 2.5-6cm long and 1.5-2.5mm thick tapering slightly from the thicker base. The surface is white and silky with a very fine powdery coating whilst the interior is hollow. The white, membranous stem ring is movable and narrow. Smell: Indistinct. Spores: Ovoid or subglobose with a narrow germ pore. 6.7-9.7 x 5-7.5μm.

Habitat and distribution 
L. subglobisporus is scarcely recorded and little known. The specimens studied by Hongo were found growing on a refuse heap in Ōtsu in the Shiga prefecture or Japan.

Similar species 

 Leucocoprinus lilacinogranulosus is noted as appearing similar but is distinguished by differences in the spore shape. However this species has since been reclassified as Leucocoprinus ianthinus.

References 

Leucocoprinus
Fungi described in 1985